Their Purple Moment is a silent short subject directed by James Parrott and Fred Guiol (who was uncredited) starring comedy duo Laurel and Hardy. It was released by Metro-Goldwyn-Mayer on May 18, 1928.

Plot
Henpecked Stan has been secretly saving money from his penny-pinching wife. When Ollie learns about Stan's stash, he suggests they use it to have a good time. However, before the twosome can leave, Stan's wife finds the wallet and replaces Stan's cash with cigar coupons—the trading stamps of the 1920s. Thus, when Stan and Ollie head out the door Stan has no idea he his wallet no longer contains cash. Stan and Ollie arrive outside an upscale cafe featuring live entertainment just in time to see the large head waiter roughly remove two male patrons who cannot pay their bill. They are followed out the door by their two dates who explain they have no money to pay the check. The girls then approach Stan and Ollie who offer to pay their outstanding restaurant bill, their accruing cab fare — and continue to treat them to a night on the town. A busybody sees Stan and Ollie enter the cafe with two strange women. She runs off to report this transgression to their wives.

Stan enjoys the cafe's all-midget floor show so much that he buys them all gifts from a cigarette girl. It is then that Stan discovers his wallet contains only cigar coupons. To buy time, Stan quickly tells the cigar girl to put the cost on his tab. When the bill finally arrives, Stan and Ollie attempt to sneak out of the cafe while the lights are dimmed during another dance performance. This plan fails miserably and they have to flee from the angry headwaiter — and their angry wives who have arrived to confront them. Their evening on the town ends in a pie-throwing brawl in the restaurant's kitchen.

Cast

Production notes
A "purple moment" is an antiquated slang term that means "a defining moment in a person's life."

References

External links 

 (excerpt)

1928 films
1928 comedy films
American silent short films
American black-and-white films
Films directed by James Parrott
Laurel and Hardy (film series)
Films with screenplays by H. M. Walker
1928 short films
American comedy short films
1920s American films
Silent American comedy films